Prainha may refer to:

Prainha (São Roque do Pico), a parish in the district of São Roque do Pico, Azores, Portugal
Prainha, Pará, Pará state, Brazil
Prainha, Praia, a subdivision of the city of Praia, Cape Verde
 Prainha (Angra do Heroísmo), a landmark in the Azores